Peperomia variifolia is a species of plant from the genus 'Peperomia'.

Distribution
Peperomia variifolia is native to Peru.

Peru

Description
Leaves are generally very short-petiolate.

References

variifolia
Flora of Peru
Plants described in 1869
Taxa named by Casimir de Candolle